is a Japanese football player and manager. He played for Japan's national football team. Currently, he play as player-manager for Okinawa SV.

Club career
Takahara was born in Mishima on 4 June 1979. After graduating from high school, he joined Júbilo Iwata in 1998. In 1998, the club won J.League Cup and he was selected New Hero awards. In 1999, the club won J1 League and Asian Club Championship. The club also reached second place at the 1999–2000 and 2000–01 Asian Club Championships. In August 2001, he moved to Boca Juniors on loan. He became the first Japanese player to play in the Argentine Primera División.

In 2002, he returned to Júbilo Iwata. The club went on to win the 2002 J.League Division 1, while Takahara became the top scorer and was elected Most Valuable Player of the year.

After the 2002 season, Takahara moved to Hamburger SV. He made his Bundesliga debut on in January 2003 in a 2–2 draw against Hannover 96, thereby becoming the third Japanese footballer to play in Bundesliga after Yasuhiko Okudera and Kazuo Ozaki. On 3 December 2006, he scored his first hat-trick in the Bundesliga in a match against Alemannia Aachen.

In January 2008 he moved to Urawa Reds for a transfer fee of around ¥180 million (around $1.7 million). Due to a disagreement with the style of coach Volker Finke, who had taken over as coach of Urawa in 2009, Takahara was leased to Suwon Samsung Bluewings of the South Korean K League 1 in July of the following year. On 31 July 2010, he made his debut as a substitute for the 39th minute of the match against Gwangju FC. On 29 August, he scored a goal in the 39th minute of the second half of the game against FC Seoul. He helped victorious game 4-2 and won the MVP in this game.

In 2011, he returned to Japan and signed with Shimizu S-Pulse. After that, he played for J2 League club Tokyo Verdy (2013–14) and J3 League club SC Sagamihara (2014–15). 

In December 2015, along with Japanese judoka Tadahiro Nomura, Takahara founded Okinawa SV. He served not only as club's president, but also played and captained the club. On 27 November 2022, he brought his club a first-time promotion for the Japan Football League, after a 4–0 over FC Kariya led them to finish as runners-up at the 2022 Regional Champions League. He featured in the match as a late substitution.

International career
In August 1995, Takahara was selected by the Japan U17 national team for 1995 U-17 World Championship. He played all three matches and scored one goal. In April 1999, he was also selected Japan U-20 national team for 1999 World Youth Championship. He played all seven matches and scored three goals. Japan achieved second place. In February 2000, he was selected by the Japan national team for 2000 Asian Cup qualification. At this qualification, on 13 February, he debuted against Singapore. He played all three matches and three goals and Japan won the qualify for 2000 Asian Cup.

In September, he was selected Japan U23 national team for 2000 Summer Olympics. He played all four matches and scored three goals in first match and quarterfinal. In October, he played at 2000 Asian Cup. He played five matches and scored five goals. Japan won the champions. However he missed the 2002 FIFA World Cup, co-hosted by his home country and South Korea, because of lung disease (venous thrombosis).

After 2002 World Cup, Takahara played at 2003 Confederations Cup. Although his convocation for Japan decreased due to the schedule, he played as regular player when he was elected Japan. In 2006, he was elected Japan for 2006 World Cup and he played all three matches. After 2006 World Cup, he played at 2007 Asian Cup. He played six matches and scored four goals, and became a top scorer. He played 57 games and scored 23 goals for Japan until 2008.

2007 Asian Cup
Takahara finished top scorer after an impressive performance at the 2007 Asian Cup. He scored against Qatar in the first match, who Japan tied 1–1. Japan won the next match, against United Arab Emirates and Takahara impressed coach Ivica Osim with two goals. In the quarterfinal match against rivals Australia, Takahara scored the tying goal and sent the game to penalty kicks. Although Takahara missed his spot-kick, saves from goalkeeper Yoshikatsu Kawaguchi sent Japan through into the semifinals, where they lost to Saudi Arabia 3–2.

Career statistics

Club 

.

International

Scores and results list Japan's goal tally first, score column indicates score after each Takahara goal.

Honours
Júbilo Iwata
 AFC Champions League: 1998–99
 Asian Super Cup: 1999
 J.League Division 1: 1999, 2002
 J.League Cup: 1998
 Japanese Super Cup: 2000

Hamburger SV
 DFB-Ligapokal: 2003
 UEFA Intertoto Cup: 2005

Okinawa SV (player-manager)
 Kyushu Soccer League: 2019, 2021, 2022
 Japanese Regional Football Champions League : 2022 (Runner-up)

Japan U17
 AFC U-17 Championship: 1994

Japan U20
 FIFA World Youth Championship runner-up: 1999

Japan
 AFC Asian Cup: 2000

Individual
 AFC U-19 Championship top scorer: 1998
 AFC Asian Cup Best Eleven: 2000
 Selected to AFC All Star Team: 2000
 J.League Most Valuable Player: 2002
 J.League Top Scorer: 2002
 J.League Best XI: 2002
 AFC Asian Cup top scorer: 2007

References

External links

 
 
 Japan National Football Team Database
 
 
 
 footballdatabase.com
 Yahoo! Sports UK

1979 births
Living people
Association football people from Shizuoka Prefecture
Japanese footballers
Association football forwards
Japan youth international footballers
Japan international footballers
J1 League players
J2 League players
J3 League players
Argentine Primera División players
Bundesliga players
K League 1 players
Júbilo Iwata players
Boca Juniors footballers
Hamburger SV players
Eintracht Frankfurt players
Urawa Red Diamonds players
Suwon Samsung Bluewings players
Shimizu S-Pulse players
Tokyo Verdy players
SC Sagamihara players
Okinawa SV players
J1 League Player of the Year winners
Footballers at the 1998 Asian Games
Footballers at the 2000 Summer Olympics
2000 AFC Asian Cup players
2003 FIFA Confederations Cup players
2006 FIFA World Cup players
2007 AFC Asian Cup players
Asian Games competitors for Japan
Olympic footballers of Japan
AFC Asian Cup-winning players
Japanese expatriate footballers
Japanese expatriate sportspeople in Argentina
Expatriate footballers in Argentina
Japanese expatriate sportspeople in Germany
Expatriate footballers in Germany
Japanese expatriate sportspeople in South Korea
Expatriate footballers in South Korea